Mavlyutovo (Mäwlet) is a rural locality (a village) in Bakayevsky Selsoviet, Kushnarenkovsky District, Bashkortostan, Russia. The population was 38 as of 2010. There is 1 streets.

Geography 
Mavlyutovo is located 22 km southwest of Kushnarenkovo (the district's administrative centre) by road. Bakayevo is the nearest rural locality.

References 

Rural localities in Kushnarenkovsky District